The FIA GT1 Brno round was an auto race held at the Masaryk Circuit, Brno, Czech Republic on 21–23 May 2010.  It was the third round of the 2010 FIA GT1 World Championship season.  The Brno circuit was last visited by the former FIA GT Championship in 2008.  Support series for the event include the FIA GT3 European Championship, Porsche Carrera Cup Italia, and the Lamborghini Blancpain Super Trofeo.

Qualifying

Qualifying result
For qualifying, Driver 1 participates in the first and third sessions while Driver 2 participates in only the second session.  The fastest lap for each session is indicated with bold.

Races

Qualifying race

Race result

Championship race

Race result

External links
 Brno GT1 Race in the Czech Republic – FIA GT1 World Championship

Brno
FIA GT1